Richard Causton may refer to:
 Richard Causton, 1st Baron Southwark (1843–1929)
 Richard Causton (composer) (born 1971)
 Richard Causton (author) (born 1920)